Can't You Tell It's Me is a Tyrone Davis album released in 1979. This was his fifth Columbia Records release and the second of 1979 with In the Mood with Tyrone Davis being released earlier in the year.

Singles
Two singles were released from the album. "Be with You", which reached No. 37 on the Billboard Hot Soul Singles chart in 1979, and the title track, which peaked at No. 58 on the same chart in 1980.

Track listing
 "Can't You Tell It's Me" (Leo Graham) – 4:16
 "Be With Me" (Leo Graham, Paul Richmond, Ruben Locke Jr.) – 6:04
 "Heart Failure" (Leo Graham, Paul Richmond) – 7:17
 "Burnin' Up" (Leo Graham, Paul Richmond) – 6:03
 "Love You Forever" (Leo Graham) – 6:44
 "Really Gonna Miss You" (Leo Graham, Eddie Fisher) – 5:10

Personnel

 Tyrone Davis – lead vocals
 Byron Gregory, Danny Leake, Herb Walker, Pat Ferreri – guitar
 Paul Richmond – guitar, bass 
 Morris Jennings – drums
 Handy Bobby Christian, Charles Kalimba-Ki, Geraldo de Oliveira – percussion
 Vince Willis – clarinet
 Billy Durham, Cinnamon, Maurice "Butch" Stewart, Wales Wallace, Wesley Stovall – background vocals

Charts

References

External links
 

1979 albums
Tyrone Davis albums
Columbia Records albums
Albums produced by Leo Graham (songwriter)